"Me!" (stylized in all caps) is a song recorded by American singer-songwriter Taylor Swift featuring American singer Brendon Urie of Panic! at the Disco. It was released on April 26, 2019, through Republic Records, as Swift's first single after signing with the label. The song was revealed and released at the end of a thirteen-day countdown, as the lead single from her seventh studio album, Lover (2019). It was written by Swift, Joel Little, and Urie, and produced by Swift and Little. The song was recorded at Electric Lady Studios, New York City, and Golden Age West in Auckland, New Zealand. "Me!" is a cheery, campy bubblegum pop and synth-pop duet, driven by a marching band drumline. It is about embracing one's individuality, with lyrics on self-affirmation and self-love.

"Me!" debuted at number 100 on the US Billboard Hot 100, before surging up to number two the next week, breaking the record for the biggest single-week jump in the chart's history. The song reached the top five in several other countries. It broke several Amazon Music records, including the most first-day streams, most first-week streams, and most on-demand voice requests with Alexa of a single debut on the platform. 

Upon release, the song received mixed reviews from music critics, who were favorable towards the bubbly production and the duo's vocal chemistry, but divided over the lyrics—some complimented the tongue-in-cheek songwriting, while others called it weak. "Me!" has since been certified double-platinum by the Recording Industry Association of America, for selling over 2 million copies in the US. In 2020, the single won the Hito Music Award for Best Western Song. A live version of the song recorded at Swift's 2019 City of Lover concert in Paris was released for digital download and streaming on May 17, 2020, after the premiere of the concert film on ABC.

The "Me!" music video, directed by Swift and Dave Meyers, accompanied the song's release. Encompassing many easter eggs, the colorful video is a symbolic departure from the previous album Reputation (2017), welcoming into the Lover era. It has been described as a "phantasmagorical delight" that induces an instant "sugar rush" in a "bubblegum psychedelia". The video amassed over 65.2 million views within its first day of release, breaking the 24-hour Vevo record previously held by Ariana Grande's "Thank U, Next", also surpassing Swift's record set in 2017 with the "Look What You Made Me Do" music video, which garnered 43.2 million views in its first day. The video scored several accolades; it won a VMA for Best Visual Effects at the 2019 MTV Video Music Awards, the Best Video at the 2019 MTV Europe Music Awards, and the Best Female International Artist Video at the 2019 MTV Video Music Awards Japan.

Background and release 

On April 13, 2019, a countdown to midnight on April 26 appeared on Taylor Swift's website, leading to speculation about the release of new music. On April 25, various news outlets reported that a mural of a butterfly in The Gulch neighborhood of Nashville, Tennessee, painted by street artist Kelsey Montague, was connected with the upcoming release. A crowd of several hundred gathered at the mural as the word "Me!" was added to it by Montague. While Montague was initially told that the mural was commissioned as promotion for ABC, ESPN and the 2019 NFL Draft, Swift appeared at the mural and revealed that it was in fact part of her countdown promotion and that she would be interviewed by Robin Roberts during the NFL Draft broadcast with further information. At the interview she confirmed the release of a new song and music video at midnight, sharing the title as well as the feature from Urie.

Composition 

"Me!" is a bubblegum and synth-pop song, driven by a marching band drumline. which was written by Swift, Joel Little of Goodnight Nurse and Brendon Urie of Panic! at the Disco, and produced by Swift and Little. The song was initially developed as a slow, acoustic, piano ballad. 

In an interview with Robin Roberts, Swift described the song as about "embracing your individuality and really owning it".

The song is performed in the key of C major in common time with a tempo of 91 beats per minute.  It follows an I–vi–IV–V chord progression known as the '50s progression (in C major, this is C–Am–F–G).  The song's vocals span from F3 to E5.

On August 21, 2019, it was reported that the lyric "Hey, kids, spelling is fun!" was removed from all digital and streaming versions of the song, including the album version. It remains in the music video and the lyric video.

Critical reception 

"Me!" received mixed reviews from music critics. Rolling Stones Rob Sheffield called the song "campy", "bubbly" and "a totally canonical Taylor Lead Single", due in respect to her past lead singles differing sonically from their respective albums. Rob Harvilla of The Ringer opined "'Me!' is a cloyingly goofy Disney-pop confection with an earworm chorus and a certain try-hard insidiousness to it". Writing for Billboard, Jason Lipshutz stated that it "is similarly shiny, and the tongue-in-cheek self-assessment of 'Blank Space' shows up in the verses, but it's also much more broad, way more cheerful and delivered without an ounce of sarcasm or snark". Forbes Hugh McIntyre wrote that it "isn't just a pop song, it's the momentary escape we all need". Erin Vanderhoof of Vanity Fair called it "pretty anodyne but catchy" and praised the collaboration between Swift and Urie. Roisin O'Connor of The Independent wrote that "Swift once again proves her mastery of the infectious pop hook in one of the most drastic reinventions of her career to date". Time's Raisa Bruner commended that Swift "veers away from her normally specific songwriting to instead offer up an anthem of self-love", and added that even though it "doesn't hit the emotional notes of her [Swift's] most memorable work, it makes a strong statement".

In an article titled "'ME!' Is Everything Wrong With Pop", The Atlantics Spencer Kornhaber wrote that the song "has almost none of the elements that once made [Swift] interesting, but it does have a dolphin screech for a chorus". Writing for Pitchfork, Anna Gaca stated that it "is a showcase for the worst and weakest aspects of Swift's work", and added "it is not hard to write a better song than this". NMEs Rhian Daly wrote that the lyrics of "Me!" "are just surface messaging about self-love and acceptance, the kind of hollow #positivity that is slapped on greeting cards and slogan t-shirts and sold as empowering". Writing for the Los Angeles Times, Mikael Wood stated that the song features "her weakest lyrics ever" and that "nothing about this song advances our thinking about Swift". Slates Carl Wilson called it "fluffy and immaterial", adding that Swift and Urie "just traipse through a kiss-and-make-up number out of a teen musical". Writing for The Daily Telegraph, Kate Solomon opined that "she's concocted what might be her most pop song to date," and went on to say that "the low point might be Swift shouting out, 'Spelling is fun, kids!' like a manic summer camp counsellor because she's noticed that 'you can’t spell awesome without me'". The Spinoffs Alice Webb-Liddall wrote "I was prepared to like it until Taylor yelled 'Spelling is fun' and from that point in the video I felt a little bit sick". Matthew McAuley from the same magazine opined that Urie "pulled out all of the stops to try and ruin this one". Writing for The Independent, Alexandra Pollard stated that the song is "so blandly uncontroversial that there is literally nothing to say about it", and that it "has proven something of a damp squib".

Awards and nominations

Commercial performance 
The song broke four Amazon Music records that includes most first-day streams, most first-week streams and most on-demand voice requests with Alexa of a single debut on the platform. On Spotify, "Me!" opened at number one on the Global Spotify charts with 7.94 million streams dated April 26, 2019, beating her 2017 hit, "Look What You Made Me Do", which opened with 7.90 million streams dated August 25, 2017.

In the US, "Me!" debuted at number 100 on the Billboard Hot 100, and ascended 98 spots to its peak of number two in its second week, behind "Old Town Road" by Lil Nas X featuring Billy Ray Cyrus, becoming the biggest single-week jump in the Hot 100's history, beating the record previously set by Kelly Clarkson's "My Life Would Suck Without You". The song debuted at number one on the Billboard Digital Song Sales chart, as Swift's record-extending sixteenth chart topper, with 193,000 sold, and at number two on Billboards Streaming Songs chart, with 50 million US streams garnered within a week. In Canada, "Me!" had a very similar run on the charts as it did in the US. On the Canadian Hot 100, "Me!" opened at number two, while debuting atop the Canadian Digital Songs Sales chart.

On the UK Singles Chart, "Me!" debuted and peaked at number three, making it Swift's ninth top five and twelfth top ten hit in the region. It also sold 67,000 downloads within its first week in the UK, making it the second biggest female sales debut of the year in the country, behind Ariana Grande's "7 Rings". "Me!" garnered the most video streams in the UK among Swift's collaborations, at 18.4 million streams. In Scotland, "Me!" debuted at number one, becoming Swift's fourth chart-topper and twelfth top ten hit in the country.  "Me!" opened at number four in Iceland, becoming Brendon Urie's highest-charting single in the country. In Ireland, "Me!" debuted at number five on the Irish Singles Chart on May 4, 2019. In the rest of Europe, "Me!" peaked at number one in Hungary, number three in Croatia and Israel, number four in Iceland, Greece, Latvia, and Slovakia, number five in the Czech Republic, Estonia, and Lithuania, number seven in Austria, number nine in Norway and Slovenia, and number ten in  Poland.

"Me!" debuted and peaked at number two on the ARIA Singles Chart dated May 4, 2019, becoming Swift's seventeenth top ten hit in Australia. In New Zealand, "Me" debuted at number three on the New Zealand singles charts, tallying Swift's fourteenth and Urie's first top 10 in the country.

Music video 
The music video for "Me!" premiered on YouTube at midnight EDT (04:00 UTC) on April 26, 2019, in a live premiere format, prefaced by a Q&A chat in the live chat text with Swift. It was directed by Swift and Dave Meyers. On April 27, 2019, it was announced that the music video amassed 65.2 million views within its first day of release, breaking the 24-hour Vevo record previously held by Ariana Grande's "Thank U, Next". The video also broke Swift's personal record set in 2017 with the "Look What You Made Me Do" music video, which garnered 43.2 million views on August 28, 2017. The music video also became the most-viewed video in 24 hours by female artist, a record that was later surpassed by Blackpink's "How You Like That" video in June 2020.

Swift has stated that there are multiple Easter eggs in the video, and that there are three levels of them in the video, from most obvious to least obvious, which point to clues about the upcoming album, single, and tour. It was revealed that "You Need to Calm Down", a line Urie says to Swift at the beginning in French, would be the second single, and an "old-timey, 1940s-sounding instrumental version" of the song plays in the background in the same scene. The album title Lover was correctly guessed in advance. Other potential titles that were speculated of being on the album were "Kaleidoscope", "Home" and "Awesome". The portrait of The Chicks was later revealed to be a reference to a collaboration for the song "Soon You'll Get Better" on the album.

The music video received three nominations at the 2019 MTV Video Music Awards, winning Best Visual Effects. A lyric video was released May 1, 2019.

Synopsis 

The setting of the video seems to be set within a chrysalis. The music video opens with a snake slithering on a floor which then explodes into a group of colourful butterflies, a probable benchmark to note the end of her previous era, Reputation, where snakes were a motif, and welcoming the inception of the upcoming one. The video pans up to show Swift and Urie engaging in an argument in French, with hard subtitles provided, in an apartment unit, in which Swift refers to her cats Meredith and Olivia as her "daughters". Swift is wearing a black and white tule dress with floral accents (which is similar to the black and white dress worn by actress Grace Kelly in the film Rear Window). Swift then leaves the room without Urie and starts singing the song upon closing the door in the hallway. Swift walks down the hallway, and the camera briefly cuts onto a group of framed artwork hung on the apartment of chicks in sunglasses and a portrait of The Chicks during the line "and there's a lot of cool chicks out there". Swift is then seen walking to the lobby accompanied with several thunderclouds, one of which is in the form of a snake that tries to swallow her up but turns to dust upon doing so. The video cuts to a scene where a suit-clad Swift dances with her backup dancers, who are holding office bags. Urie looks out onto the street from the apartment and jumps down the balcony on an umbrella Mary Poppins-style wearing a floral print suit.

He lands on the roof of a building with a unicorn-shaped eave, where Swift is seen sitting at the edge with a pink dress that turns to a waterfall. This is where the Lover sign is spotted. Urie then tries and fails to win Swift over with classic and banal items such as a bouquet of flowers and a ring. He then awes her by presenting a cat, which Taylor later adopted as her third pet and named Benjamin Button. The camera cuts to Urie opening his heart, which is revealed to be a kaleidoscope. Swift has revealed on an Instagram livestream that this is a reference to her 2014 song, "Welcome to New York", where she sings "kaleidoscope of loud heartbeats under coats". Urie and Swift then sing on a heart-shaped pinkish-orange stage, joined with a band of angels and go-go dancers wearing 1960s mod style clothing. As the bridge plays, Swift and Urie don blue marching band uniforms and dance with a group of dancers in the same attire, but pink. The video then cuts to a scene of the duo dancing on a floating window with a psychedelic-esque background. The last scene then depicts Swift in a blue attire that melts into what seems to be liquid bubblegum while a running Urie summons the same rain-like pastel liquid around the street. The video ends with the duo entering the same apartment building with an umbrella as the bubblegum rain continues on the street in the night.

In her Netflix documentary Miss Americana, Swift describes the concept of the music video to be related the song's message of individualism and self-empowerment by demonstrating hobbies and characteristics that make herself and Urie unique: emo kids and musical theatre for Urie and cats, gay pride, and cowboy boots for Swift.

Reception 
The video broke the Vevo record, as well as the YouTube record for most views in the first 24 hours for a lead female video, and the third most-viewed overall earning 65.2 million views. It also broke the Vevo record of the fastest video to reach 100 million views at the time, doing so in 79 hours.

Chris Willman of Variety described the music video as a "phantasmagorical delight" that induces an instant "sugar rush" in a "bubblegum psychedelia".

Live performances, covers and usage in media 
On May 1, 2019, Swift and Urie opened the 2019 Billboard Music Awards with a performance of "Me!". On May 21, 2019, Swift and Urie performed the song at the finale of the sixteenth season of The Voice. Swift and Urie also performed the song on June 1, 2019, at the 2019 Wango Tango. She performed a solo version of the song at the finale of the fourteen season of Germany's Next Topmodel on May 23, on The Graham Norton Show in the United Kingdom, and at the eighth season of the French version of The Voice along with "Shake It Off" on May 25, 2019. On July 10, 2019, Swift performed the song at her headlining Amazon Prime Day concert along with "You Need to Calm Down" and a number of songs from her previous albums.

She performed the song along with "You Need to Calm Down" and "Shake It Off" at a Good Morning America concert in Central Park on August 22. On September 9, Swift performed the song at the City of Lover one-off concert at L'Olympia in Paris, France. She released this live version on digital music platforms on May 17, 2020. On October 19, she performed the song at the We Can Survive charity concert in Los Angeles. She performed the song on the Sukkiri Morning Show in Tokyo, Japan on November 7, and the Alibaba Singles' Day Gala in Shanghai, China on November 10. On December 8, Swift performed the song at Capital FM's Jingle Bell Ball 2019 in London. On December 13, she performed the song at iHeartRadio Z100's Jingle Ball in New York City.

Hours after the song's release, ABC and ESPN used the song for their intro for night 2 of the 2019 NFL Draft, a day after Swift broke the news of the song's release, in an interview with ABC's Robin Roberts. The song was also used in a commercial Swift filmed in partnership with Capital One in 2019 and in trailers for Pablo on CBeebies in 2020.

On June 28, 2021, a cover of "Me!" by Taiwanese singer Tzuyu, a member of South Korean girl group Twice, featuring Bang Chan of Stray Kids, was released. A 10-second teaser of the cover was posted to YouTube on June 22, 2021, which accumulated 1.7 million views in a day.

Credits and personnel 
Credits adapted from liner notes of "Me!" and Tidal

Personnel
 Taylor Swift – vocals, songwriter, producer
 Joel Little – producer, songwriter, drum programming, guitar, keyboards, record engineering, synthesizer programming
 Brendon Urie – vocals, songwriter
 John Rooney – record engineering assistance
 Serban Ghenea – mix engineering
 John Hanes – mix engineering
 Randy Merrill – master engineering

Charts

Weekly charts

Year-end charts

Certifications

Release history

See also 

 List of most-viewed online videos in the first 24 hours
 List of most expensive music videos
 List of Billboard Hot 100 top-ten singles in 2019
 List of number-one digital songs of 2019 (U.S.)
 List of number-one digital songs of 2019 (Canada)
 List of UK top-ten singles in 2019
 List of number one singles in Scotland (2019)
 List of top 10 singles in 2019 (Australia)
 List of number-one digital tracks of 2019 (Australia)
 List of airplay number-one hits of the 2010s (Argentina)

References

External links 
 Review by Todd in the Shadows

2019 singles
2019 songs
Bubblegum pop songs
American synth-pop songs
Taylor Swift songs
Brendon Urie songs
Songs written by Taylor Swift
Songs written by Brendon Urie
Songs written by Joel Little
Song recordings produced by Joel Little
Republic Records singles
Music videos directed by Dave Meyers (director)
Music videos directed by Taylor Swift
Male–female vocal duets
Number-one singles in Scotland
Song recordings produced by Taylor Swift